Güçlükonak is a town and seat of the Güçlükonak District in Şırnak Province, Turkey. The town is populated by Kurds of the Harunan tribe and had a population of 4,462 in 2021.

Neighborhoods 
The town is divided into the neighborhoods of Bağlar and Yeni Mahalle.

History 
As of January 2020, no person has been charged for the massacre.

References

Populated places in Şırnak Province
Kurdish settlements in Şırnak Province